The Primetime Emmy Award for Outstanding Writing for a Nonfiction Program is awarded to one television documentary or nonfiction series each year.

In the following list, the first titles listed in gold are the winners; those not in gold are nominees, which are listed in alphabetical order. The years given are those in which the ceremonies took place:



Winners and nominations

1970s

1980s

1990s

2000s

2010s

2020s

Programs with multiple awards

4 wins
 American Masters

2 wins
 American Experience
 Anthony Bourdain: Parts Unknown

Individuals with multiple awards

4 awards
 Geoffrey C. Ward

2 awards
 Alex Gibney
 Anthony Bourdain

Programs with multiple nominations

9 nominations
 American Masters

8 nominations
 American Experience

7 nominations
 Anthony Bourdain: Parts Unknown

4 nominations
 Penn & Teller: Bullshit!

3 nominations
 Heritage: Civilization and the Jews

Notes

References

Writing for Nonfiction Programming
Screenwriting awards for television